U.S. Route 60 (US 60) runs northwest to southeast across the central and southern portions of West Virginia. It runs from the Kentucky state line at Catlettsburg, Kentucky and Kenova. The road passes through Huntington, Charleston, and White Sulphur Springs. The route exits the state into Virginia concurrently with Interstate 64 east of White Sulphur Springs. Most of US 60's route through West Virginia is part of and even signed in several areas as the Midland  Trail.

Major intersections

References

 West Virginia
Transportation in Cabell County, West Virginia
Transportation in Fayette County, West Virginia
Transportation in Greenbrier County, West Virginia
Transportation in Kanawha County, West Virginia
Transportation in Putnam County, West Virginia
Transportation in Wayne County, West Virginia
60